Prince of Central Park is a 2000 family movie. The cast included Kathleen Turner, Danny Aiello, Harvey Keitel, and Cathy Moriarty. It was written and directed by John Leekley, and produced by Julius R. Nasso, Steven Seagal, and John P. Gulino. The film is a remake of the 1977 TV movie The Prince of Central Park starring Ruth Gordon and T. J. Hargrave; both films were based on the novel The Prince of Central Park by Evan Rhodes.

Plot
12-year-old J.J. Somerled (Frankie Nasso) runs away because his mother died and he has been placed in the care of an abusive foster mother. He takes his electronic keyboard, and lives in Central Park in New York City. He learns a lot, and meets a lot of people there including a person called "The Guardian" (Harvey Keitel).

Cast

Adaptation

Rhodes also adapted his own novel for Broadway in 1989, but the production, starring Jo Anne Worley, was so poorly received  it closed after four performances.
The production was directed and choreographed by Tony Tanner. The sets and costumes were designed by Michael Bottari and Ronald Case, who received many good reviews for their turntable set design. The Lighting Design was by Norman Coates.
There was a production prior to the Broadway opening in Miami Beach that was directed by Bob Bogdanoff and starred Nannette Fabray. Many have thought that if Nannette Fabray stayed with the show, that the musical would have lasted longer.
The Broadway production played at the Belasco Theater.  In addition to JoAnne Worley, it starred a young Richard H. Blake, who would go on to become a familiar face on Broadway in such shows as The Wedding Singer, Saturday Night Fever, and Legally Blonde: The Musical. Anthony Galde (of Starlight Express-Broadway and 1st U.S. Tour, Film: Just One of the Guys) played the leader of the street gang.

References

External links
 
 

2000 films
Remakes of American films
2000 drama films
American drama films
Films set in Manhattan
Films scored by Theodore Shapiro
2000 directorial debut films
2000s American films